The Oxford University Mountaineering Club (OUMC) was founded in 1909 by Arnold Lunn, then a Balliol undergraduate; he did not earn a degree.

History
The club has taken a significant part in the development of mountaineering in the United Kingdom, and many famous British climbers have been members of the club. Andrew Irvine was at Merton College and was a member of the OUMC at the time of his fatal attempt to climb Everest with George Mallory. Tom Bourdillon (whose father was one of the club's founders), Charles Evans and Michael Westmacott, all former members of the OUMC, were members of the successful 1953 British Expedition to Everest. Evans was Deputy Leader to John Hunt on that expedition, Bourdillon was responsible for the oxygen apparatus, and Westmacott was in charge of keeping the dangerous passage through the Khumbu Icefall open. Bourdillon and Evans made the first attempt on the summit, on 26 May 1953, three days before the successful climb by Sir Edmund Hillary and Tenzing Norgay. They reached the South Summit (at 8750 m then the highest summit to have been climbed), but had to turn back due to severe exhaustion. Charles Evans was later the Leader of the first successful expedition to Kangchenjunga in 1955.

Stephen Venables was the first British climber to climb Everest without using an oxygen cylinder; he climbed to the South Col via the Kangshung Face, creating a new route, and then went solo to the summit, as his colleagues were exhausted.

The club has sent exploratory mountaineering expeditions to mountain ranges all over the world. It claims first ascents of peaks in such places as Greenland, the Himalayas, the Karakoram, Kishtwar, Peru, Spitsbergen, and Wakhan.

Governance
The club is operated by committee – the executive (president, secretary, treasurer) is always made up from Oxford University Students but the wider committee roles are open to any members.

Functions and traditions
The club typically meets on a Wednesday during Oxford term time at the Gardeners Arms pub. This is where members can sign up to go on weekend 'meets'. Meets are organised climbing trips facilitated by the hire of a minibus and campsite. The club meets typically include overnight trips to Dartmoor, the Lake District and Cornwall and single day trips to the Wye Valley and Peak District.
Alongside outdoor climbing trips the club typically organises:
 a roped up pub crawl in the first week's of term – where all attendees must negotiate the streets of Oxford whilst being tied to one another. 
 a ceilidh.
 a Christmas dinner.

Notable members
Sir Arnold Lunn (1888–1974), Balliol 
Robert Benedict Bourdillon (1889–1971), Balliol 
Andrew Irvine (1902–1924), Merton 
Charles Evans (1918–1995), New College 
Tom Bourdillon (1924–1956), Balliol
Michael Westmacott (b. 1925), Balliol, president
Sir Anthony James Leggett (b. 1938), Balliol 
Stephen Venables (b. 1954), New College
George Atkinson (b. 1994), Linacre College

References

External links
 Club website

Other notable mountaineering clubs 

 Preston Mountaineering Club
 Glasgow University Mountaineering Club

1909 establishments in England
Sports clubs established in 1909
Mountaineering Club
Climbing organizations